Walter Harriman may refer to:

Walter Harriman (politician) (1817–1884), American politician, Governor of New Hampshire
Walter Harriman (Stargate), a fictional character on the Stargate universe